Patriarch Maxim or Patriarch Maksim may refer to:

 Bulgarian Patriarch Maxim, Archbishop of Trnovo and Bulgarian Patriarch from 1971 to 2012
 Serbian Patriarch Maxim, Archbishop of Peć and Serbian Patriarch from 1655 to 1680

See also
 Patriarch (disambiguation)
 Maxim (disambiguation)
 Maxim (given name)
 List of Patriarchs of the Bulgarian Orthodox Church
 List of heads of the Serbian Orthodox Church